The 2022 SheBelieves Cup, named the 2022 SheBelieves Cup Presented by Visa for sponsorship reasons, was the seventh edition of the SheBelieves Cup, an invitational women's soccer tournament held in the United States. Featuring national teams from Czech Republic, Iceland, New Zealand, and hosts United States, it began on February 17 and ended on February 23, 2022.

The United States defended their title, winning their third straight and fifth overall title. Catarina Macario was named the most valuable player of the tournament.

Format
The four invited teams played a round-robin tournament. Points awarded in the group stage followed the formula of three points for a win, one point for a draw, and zero points for a loss. In the event two teams were tied in points, tie-breakers would be applied in the order of goal difference, goals scored, head-to-head result, and a fair play score based on the number of yellow and red cards.

Venue

Squads

Teams

Standings

Results

Individual Award 
Following the final game, the SheBelieves Cup awarded a Most Valuable Player (MVP) award, named the Visa SheBelieves Cup MVP for sponsorship reasons. A five-member selection committee made up of representatives from the four participating nations and one other person nominated four finalists for the award: U.S. forwards Catarina Macario and Sophia Smith, Iceland midfielder Dagný Brynjarsdóttir, and Czech Republic goalkeeper Barbora Votíková. Fans as well as the committee voted for a winner from the list of finalists, with Macario winning the MVP award.

Goalscorers

References

External links
Official website

2022
SheBelieves Cup
2022 in American women's soccer
SheBelieves Cup